The 1991–92 season was Port Vale's 80th season of football in the English Football League, and third successive (35th overall) season in the Second Division. For only the third time in their history they competed in a division above rivals Stoke City. However it was not a happy campaign, John Rudge was forced to deal with star players Darren Beckford and Robbie Earle being sold for combined fees of £1.7 million. He spent just £375,000 to bring future-legend Martin Foyle to the club, whilst reliable goalkeeper Mark Grew was handed the club's Player of the Year award. Vale were relegated in bottom place, just five points short of safety. They exited the League Cup at the Third Round, despite a credible 2–2 draw with Liverpool at Anfield. Leaving the FA Cup at the Third Round, they were knocked out at the Second Round stage of the Full Members Cup.

Overview

Second Division
The pre-season saw John Rudge sign aged striker Keith Houchen from Hibernian for £100,000. He also spent £300,000 on Hull City defender Peter Swan. This money was raised through the sale of top-scorer Darren Beckford to Norwich City for £925,000 after a Football League tribunal (Vale had wanted £1.5 million). As well as losing his star striker, Rudge had to deal with the departure of his midfield dynamo, Robbie Earle having been sold to Wimbledon for £775,000. To replace Beckford, Rudge signed Martin Foyle from Oxford United for a fee of £375,000. The transfers of both Beckford and Foyle were club-records.

The season started positively, with new man Foyle getting both goals in a 2–1 win over his former employers Oxford. In September, Houchen suffered a tear in his hamstring, and struggled to regain his place upon his recovery. To replace him, Jason Beckford, younger brother of Darren, was brought in on loan from Manchester City. He proved somewhat less prolific than his sibling. The Vale only picked up one victory in nine league games, Houchen bagging a brace in a 2–0 victory over Wolverhampton Wanderers at Molineux. Heading into December they had lost just three games in a sequence of ten league matches. Yet from 7 December to 21 March they went on a club-record seventeen games without a win (recording ten defeats). During this spell Andy Williams played a handful of games after arriving on a loan deal from Leeds United. Colin West then joined the club on loan from West Bromwich Albion. In February, Rudge took forward Joe Allon on loan from Chelsea. The next month, winger David Lowe arrived on loan from Ipswich Town. Out went Ryan Kidd, signing for Preston North End on a free transfer. At the end of March, victories over Plymouth Argyle and Blackburn Rovers raised hopes of a last minute escape. Picking up five points in the first four games of April, their fate rested in their hands. They failed to escape the drop however, losing both to Cambridge United at the Abbey Stadium and to Grimsby Town at Vale Park.

They finished bottom of the table with 45 points, five points short of the safety of Oxford United. With 42 goals scored Vale had the lowest tally in the division, along with Plymouth, though their 59 goals conceded was a respectable total. Foyle was top-scorer with eleven league goals and sixteen in all competitions. At the end of the season young right-back Paul West was permitted to join Bradford City on a free transfer.

Finances
The club's shirt sponsors were Kalamazoo.

Cup competitions
In the FA Cup, Vale were easily dispatched by Sunderland, who recorded a 3–0 victory at Roker Park.

In the League Cup, Vale advanced past Notts County on away goals with a 2–1 win at Vale Park and a 3–2 defeat at Meadow Lane. Facing First Division Liverpool in the Third Round, the "Valiants" achieved a 2–2 draw at Anfield against a first eleven of eight internationals. Robin van der Laan put the Vale ahead on seven minutes after heading past Bruce Grobbelaar from a Simon Mills corner. Steve McManaman equalized three minutes later from a Mark Walters assist, and Liverpool took the lead on 65 minutes after Ian Rush headed in a McManaman flick on. Vale earned a replay on 73 minutes, when Martin Foyle hit the net from a Peter Swan header. Yet they were knocked out of the competition as the "Reds" recorded a 4–1 win in Burslem in front of an 18,725 strong crowd.

In the short-lived Full Members Cup, Vale progress past Blackburn Rovers with a 1–0 win through a Foyle goal. They were then eliminated in the next round with a 4–0 defeat to Leicester City at Filbert Street.

League table

Results
Port Vale's score comes first

Football League Second Division

Results by matchday

Matches

FA Cup

League Cup

Full Members Cup

Player statistics

Appearances

Top scorers

Transfers

Transfers in

Transfers out

Loans in

References
Specific

General

Port Vale F.C. seasons
Port Vale